Phantolabis is a genus of crane fly in the family Limoniidae.

Distribution
Michigan, United States.

Species
N. lacustris (Alexander, 1938)

References

Limoniidae
Diptera of North America